The 2022 World Mixed Curling Championship was held from 15 to 22 October in Aberdeen, Scotland. It was the first World Mixed Curling Championship held since 2019 because of the COVID-19 pandemic.

Teams
The teams are listed as follows:

Round-robin standings
Final round-robin standings

Round-robin results

All draw times are listed in British Summer Time (UTC+01:00).

Draw 1
Saturday, October 15, 8:00

Draw 2
Saturday, October 15, 12:00

Draw 3
Saturday, October 15, 16:00

Draw 4
Saturday, October 15, 20:00

Draw 5
Sunday, October 16, 8:00

Draw 6
Sunday, October 16, 12:00

Draw 7
Sunday, October 16, 16:00

Draw 8
Sunday, October 16, 20:00

Draw 9
Monday, October 17, 8:00

Draw 10
Monday, October 17, 12:00

Draw 11
Monday, October 17, 16:00

Draw 12
Monday, October 17, 20:00

Draw 13
Tuesday, October 18, 8:00

Draw 14
Tuesday, October 18, 12:00

Draw 15
Tuesday, October 18, 16:00

Draw 16
Tuesday, October 18, 20:00

Draw 17
Wednesday, October 19, 8:00

Draw 18
Wednesday, October 19, 12:00

Draw 19
Wednesday, October 19, 16:00

Draw 20
Wednesday, October 19, 20:00

Draw 21
Thursday, October 20, 8:00

Draw 22
Thursday, October 20, 12:00

Draw 23
Thursday, October 20, 16:00

Draw 24
Thursday, October 20, 20:00

Playoffs

Qualification games
Friday, October 21, 10:00

Quarterfinals
Friday, October 21, 18:00

Semifinals
Saturday, October 22, 9:30

Bronze medal game
Saturday, October 22, 14:30

Gold medal game
Saturday, October 22, 14:30

Final standings

References

World Mixed Curling Championship
World Mixed Curling Championship
World Mixed Curling Championship
Sports competitions in Aberdeen
International curling competitions hosted by Scotland
World Mixed Curling Championship